Harry Tincknell (born 29 October 1991 in Exeter, Devon) is a British professional racing driver currently racing in the IMSA WeatherTech SportsCar Championship for Mazda Team Joest. He won the LMP2 class on his Le Mans 24 Hour race debut in 2014 and again in LMGTE Pro in 2020, the first driver in the race's history to win in both LMP2 and LMGTE Pro. Other notable victories include the 2016 European Le Mans Series title and the overall win at the 2020 12 Hours of Sebring.

Career

Karting
Tincknell made his karting début in 2001, finishing in the top five of both the Dunkeswell Club Championship and the South West British Championship series. After competing in Cadets in 2002, Tincknell moved up to TKM karts in 2003, winning the Winter Series at the Shenington kart circuit in Oxfordshire. He continued at that level in 2004, winning a round at Larkhall and finished in 27th place in the championship for Connaught Racing. Tincknell moved into the ICA Junior Belgian Championship in 2005, and finished in fifth position in the championship, 65 points behind champion Laurens Vanthoor.

Tincknell stayed at ICA Junior level for the 2006 season, competing in the WSK International Series. He finished fourteenth in the championship, despite earning a third-place finish at La Conca, Italy. Tincknell frequented in various series in 2007, competing in no less than eight different championships or trophy races during the season. His best result was fourth in the South Garda Winter Cup, finishing behind Yannick de Brabander, António Félix da Costa and Robin Frijns. 2008 was Tincknell's final season in karting, and he finished as runner-up in the Euro Rotax Max Challenge.

Formula Renault
Tincknell moved into the Formula Renault UK Winter Series in 2008 and finished seventh with points-scoring finishes in each of the four races with CR Scuderia. He also contested two races of the Fórmula Júnior Portugal Winter Series, finishing in sixth and eighth places during the two races in Estoril. In 2009, Tincknell remained with the newly renamed CRS Racing, to contest a full season of Formula Renault UK. He started well, setting the first pole position of the season at Brands Hatch before finishing behind Oliver Webb in the first race. Further podiums came at Thruxton, Oulton Park and Rockingham as Tincknell finished fifth overall in the championship standings. His consistent finishing also earned him the Graduate Cup title, where first-year drivers battle for honours, with the best fifteen finishes for each drivers counting towards the championship. At the conclusion of the season, Tincknell dominated the Winter Series, finishing each of the four races on the podium and winning two of them. He also contested a round of the Formula Renault 2.0 Northern European Cup at Oschersleben, finishing both races in seventeenth place.

Tincknell continued in the series in 2010, leading a four-car challenge from CRS Racing. Tincknell was also confirmed as one of ten drivers selected by the UK's motorsport governing body, the Motor Sports Association, to take part in its driver development programme, Team UK. Considered to be the top 10 most promising young racing drivers in the UK, each member of the team received in-car performance, fitness and nutrition training as well as advanced sports psychology, care of the Brabham Performance Clinic, created by David Brabham.

Tincknell started the 2010 season off well with 5 podiums and a 1 win in the first 8 races of the season at Thruxton, Rockingham, Brands Hatch and Oulton Park. After a difficult weekend at the Croft circuit, he bounced back to take a pole position and victory at Snetterton breaking the lap record which still stands on the way to the win. However, the final 4 rounds of the season proved a struggle for the team with the new Formula Renault car and Tincknell managed one more podium and 3 top five places to eventually finish 5th overall in the championship.

At the start of 2010, Tincknell was also invited to become to part of the British Racing Drivers' Club Rising Stars programme. He was also confirmed as one of ten drivers selected by the UK's motorsport governing body, the Motor Sports Association, to take part in its driver development programme, Team UK. Considered to be the top 10 most promising young racing drivers in the UK, each member of the team received in-car performance, fitness and nutrition training as well as advanced sports psychology, care of the Brabham Performance Clinic, created by David Brabham.

British Formula Three
Tincknell signed with Fortec Motorsport to race in the British Formula 3 Championship in 2011. After a tough start to the year at Monza he claimed in his first F3 podium at Oulton Park at the second race of the season before going on to finish 2nd at the next round at Snetterton. At the following round at Brands Hatch Grand Prix Circuit, Tincknell took his first win of his Formula Three career leading the race from pole position. He claimed his 4th podium of the season at the Nurburgring, Germany. After starting in 8th position, Tincknell made an astonishing start to make up 5 places on the way down to the first corner and ended the race in 3rd position. After a good start to the season Tincknell finished the championship in 11th position with 1 win and 4 podiums.

After the end of the 2011 season Tincknell signed for multiple British F3 Champion team Carlin. After impressing in initial testing Tincknell suffered a freak accident at the Circuit de Spa-Francorchamps in Belgium, breaking his right hand severely which needed to be operated on back in the UK. This put him out of action for the rest of the year.

In 2012 Tincknell returned to the British Formula 3 Championship and took his first podium at the first round of the year at Oulton Park. Two DNFs followed at Monza and Pau before Tincknell got his season back on track winning at Rockingham on the championships return to the UK. Tincknell then scored another 3rd place and fastest lap at Brands Hatch before the championship combined with the Formula Three Euroseries meeting at Norisring. Tincknell took 8th overall and 3rd place in British F3 in race one before scoring a lights to flag victory in race two, his first European win in car racing. He then scored another dominant win at the Snetterton Circuit and ended the year in good style with two third places at Silverstone and another win at Donington Park in the season Finale. He finished 5th overall in the Championship with 4 wins and 9 podiums. He also contested the 2012 Historic Pau Grand Prix in a 1965 Lotus 20 in the Formula Junior category finishing 2nd in both races.

Tincknell returned to his former F3 team, Fortec Motorsport for the prestigious Macau Grand Prix in November 2012. On his debut at the notoriously difficult Guia Circuit, Tincknell had an outstanding weekend, qualifying 7th overall and finishing 6th in the Qualification race in the 30 strong world class field. Tincknell had a great start in the final to move up to 4th position but after encountering a mechanical issue during the race, finished 9th.

FIA Formula 3 European Championship
At the beginning of 2013, Tincknell extended his deal with multiple Championship winning team, Carlin Motorsport, for the 2013 season of the FIA European Formula Three Championship. The five-time Formula Three race winner continued his relationship with the team and has been joined by Canadian racer Nicholas Latifi and British rookies Jann Mardenborough and Jordan King.

Tincknell emerged from the first rounds of the FIA Formula 3 European Championship at the Autodromo di Monza in 3rd place in the points table after a dramatic opening weekend to the season with the final two races taking place in treacherous conditions.

Tincknell then scored an emotional win at Silverstone from a double pole position. It was the first time the 21-year-old from Devon has scored maximum points in the championship and was also a landmark victory for the Carlin team that runs his Volkswagen-powered Dallara – it was the squad's first-ever success in a non-reversed-grid race on the series' control Hankook tyres.

With the win at Silverstone, Tincknell became the first Briton to win a round of the FIA F3 European Championship, revived in 2012 after a 29-year break, since ex-Lotus Formula 1 driver and Jaguar Le Mans winner Johnny Dumfries. It was also the first time Tincknell topped qualifying in his F3 career. Tincknell remained in third position in the Championship.

Tincknell then had a tough weekend in the third round of the series at Hockenheim, finishing the weekend with a strong fifth-place finish but slipping to fifth in the Championship.

Tincknell claimed his second FIA Formula 3 European Championship podium finish of the season after a strong performance in the latest round at Brands Hatch on 18–19 May 2013. Tincknell was third on the road in the third and final race of the weekend, but was moved up to second place when race winner Raffaele Marciello was excluded for a technical infringement.

European Le Mans Series
In 2014, Tincknell switched from single seaters to sportscars. He signed with JOTA Sport to race a Zytek Z11SN-Nissan in the European Le Mans Series and finished 2nd in the 2014 ELMS Driver's Championship (74 points total) with Simon Dolan and Filipe Albuquerque after 1 win, 3 podiums and three personal poles. He was ELMS “Rookie of the Year” and also won the BRDC Woolf Barnato Trophy.

In 2015, Harry re-signed with the British Jota Sport outfit in when the factory Nissan NISMO LM P1 team opted to delay its race programme. He subsequently finished 3rd in the ELMS Driver's Championship (89 points total) driving a Gibson 015S-Nissan (formerly designated the Zytek Z11SN-Nissan) with Dolan and Albuquerque again in the five-race series, after 1 win, 4 podiums, 2 personal poles, three front row starts and two fastest race laps.

In 2016 he returned to the European Le Mans Series with Jota Sport (rebranded G-Drive Racing) Gibson-Nissan, teaming up once again with Simon Dolan and new signing Giedo van der Garde. He won the ELMS Driver's Championship with 2 wins and 4 podiums, taking a dramatic victory at the Estoril circuit in Portugal to clinch the title by 7 points.

FIA World Endurance Championship
Tincknell contested two FIA World Endurance Championship races in 2014—both with his ELMS team Jota Sport. He finished 2nd (LM P2) in the Six Hours of Spa-Francorchamps and then won LM P2 on his Le Mans 24 Hour race début finishing 5th overall in the Zytek Z11SN-Nissan.

In 2015, Tincknell was announced as a factory Nissan NISMO LMP1 WEC race and development driver. When the race programme was delayed, Tincknell competed in the Six Hours of Spa-Francorchamps with Jota Sport once again and won—setting the fastest time in the LMP2 class.

He ultimately made his LMP1 race début in the Nissan GT-R LM Nismo in the Le Mans 24 Hours—the team's only race of the FIA World Endurance Championship season that year. He set the fastest lap time for Nissan in qualifying and again in the race itself. After extensive testing during the summer of 2016, Nissan cancelled their LMP1 program in December. the

In March 2016 Harry Tincknell was confirmed as one of the factory drivers to co-drive the all-new Ford GT LM GTE with Ford Chip Ganassi Racing Team UK in the FIA World Endurance Championship and also for the Le Mans 24 Hours. Alongside teammates Andy Priaulx MBE and Marino Franchitti he finished 5th in the Driver's Championship, winning the Fuji and Shanghai rounds alongside Priaulx. At the Le Mans 24 hours, the car suffered a gearbox problem before the start of the race, ultimately finishing 9th.

In 2017, Tincknell returned to the FIA World Endurance Championship with Ford Chip Ganassi Racing Team UK with Andy Priaulx MBE and new Ford signing Pipo Derani. The trio won the opening round at Silverstone, UK and finished 2nd at the 24 Hours of Le Mans. Tinckell and Priaulx would take a further victory in Shanghai and podium in Bahrain en route to 3rd in the drivers championship.

During the first round of 2018–19 season Tincknell had a major accident at the Six Hours of Spa race after a front end mechanical failure caused a head on impact with the tyre barrier at the famous Eau Rouge corner. Despite a 29G impact he was unharmed. At Le Mans, he and Priaulx were joined by Indy 500 winner Tony Kanaan. The trio finished 4th but a post race penalty demoted them to 9th. Podiums at Fuji and Sebring were followed with 4th at the 2019 24 Hours of Le Mans, this time partnered by Jonathan Bomarito.

Tincknell joined Aston Martin Racing in the #97 Vantage for the 2020 24 Hours of Le Mans. Alongside fellow Brit Alex Lynn and Belgian Maxime Martin, the trio won the GTE Pro class by 1 minute 33 seconds.

Formula E
In August 2016, Tincknell was listed among four drivers who would drive for Jaguar in the pre-season test at Donington Park.

In 2017 Tincknell tested for the NIO Formula E Team, going on to drive at the inaugural Formula E Rookie test in Marrakech and signed as their Simulation Development Driver in 2018.

In 2019, he returned to the Marrakesh Rookie test with Jaguar.

IMSA

Tincknell signed with Mazda Team Joest for the 2018 and 2019 IMSA WeatherTech Sportscar Championship seasons. He scored Mazda's first win in 7 years at the 2019 6 Hours of Watkins Glen and won again at Road America alongside teammate Jonathan Bomarito. They also finished on the podium at Mosport having led the majority of the race, but an issue fitting the right rear tyre in the final pit stop dropped them to 2nd.

In 2020, Tincknell signed a long-term deal with Multimatic which would keep him in IMSA with Mazda for at least the 2020 and 2021 seasons. Following postponements due to COVID-19 pandemic, Tincknell and Bomarito won the Daytona 240 race and teamed up with Indycar Champion Ryan Hunter-Reay to finish 2nd at the 6 Hours of Road Atlanta and win the 12 Hours of Sebring. The win at Sebring helped them secure 3rd overall in the drivers championship.

Racing record

Career summary

† As Tincknell was a guest driver, he was ineligible to score points.

Complete FIA Formula 3 European Championship results
(key) (Races in bold indicate pole position; races in italics indicate fastest lap)

† As Tincknell was a guest driver, he was ineligible for points.

Complete European Le Mans Series results

Complete 24 Hours of Le Mans results

Complete FIA World Endurance Championship results
(key) (Races in bold indicate pole position; races in
italics indicate fastest lap)

† As Tincknell was a guest driver, he was ineligible to score points.

Complete IMSA SportsCar Championship results

† Points only counted towards the Michelin Endurance Cup, and not the overall LMP2 Championship.
* Season still in progress.

Personal
Tincknell attended St. John's School in Sidmouth, Devon, until the age of 12. He then attended Exeter School, where he achieved 10 GCSEs: six As and four Bs. Away from the race track, Tincknell enjoys playing golf, darts, rugby, and chess, as well as supporting Plymouth Argyle, his local football club.

References

External links

 
 

1991 births
Living people
Sportspeople from Exeter
English racing drivers
British Formula Renault 2.0 drivers
Portuguese Formula Renault 2.0 drivers
Formula Renault 2.0 NEC drivers
British Formula Three Championship drivers
Formula 3 Euro Series drivers
FIA Formula 3 European Championship drivers
MRF Challenge Formula 2000 Championship drivers
24 Hours of Le Mans drivers
European Le Mans Series drivers
FIA World Endurance Championship drivers
24 Hours of Daytona drivers
12 Hours of Sebring drivers
Carlin racing drivers
Blancpain Endurance Series drivers
WeatherTech SportsCar Championship drivers
CRS Racing drivers
Nismo drivers
G-Drive Racing drivers
Fortec Motorsport drivers
Chip Ganassi Racing drivers
Team Joest drivers
Aston Martin Racing drivers
Multimatic Motorsports drivers
Jota Sport drivers